"Cold Rock a Party" is the lead single released from American rapper MC Lyte's fifth studio album, Bad As I Wanna B (1996). While the original version of the song that appears on the album was produced by Rashad Smith and samples Audio Two's "Top Billin", the single version features Missy "Misdemeanor" Elliott, was produced by Sean Combs, and samples Diana Ross' 1980 hit "Upside Down".

The song became MC Lyte's second-highest-charting single in the United States (after her previous single "Keep On, Keepin' On"), peaking at  11 on the Billboard Hot 100, and it received a gold certification from the Recording Industry Association of America (RIAA) for sales of more than 500,000 copies. To date, it is MC Lyte's last single to appear on the Billboard Hot 100. "Cold Rock a Party" also became a hit in several other countries, including New Zealand, where it reached No. 1 for two weeks.

Critical reception
Larry Flick from Billboard described "Cold Rock a Party" as "a classic party rocker", noting that it is combining "Lyte's melodic flow" with the high-powered instrumental to "Upside Down". Peter Miro from Cash Box declared it a "gem" of the Bad As I Wanna B album. A reviewer from Music Week rated the song five out of five, adding that the veteran female rapper "returns with a hip hop biggie", that is "already receiving big club and media exposure. A good bet for the charts."

Track listings

 US CD single
 "Cold Rock a Party" (Bad Boy Remix—main version) – 4:37
 "Cold Rock a Party" (Bad Boy Remix—MC Lyte main version) – 4:37
 "Cold Rock a Party" (original album version) – 4:17
 "Have U Ever" (album version) – 3:33
 "Cold Rock a Party" (Milk Remix) – 3:19
 "Paper Thin" (album version) – 5:14

 US cassette single
 "Cold Rock a Party" (Bad Boy Remix—clean radio edit) – 4:05
 "Have U Ever" (LP version) – 3:33

 European cassette single
 "Cold Rock a Party" (Bad Boy Remix—clean radio edit) – 4:11
 "Cold Rock a Party" (original version—clean) – 4:17

 European and Australian maxi-single
 "Cold Rock a Party" (Bad Boy Remix—clean radio edit) – 4:05
 "Cold Rock a Party" (Bad Boy Remix—main version) – 4:37
 "Cold Rock a Party" (original version—clean) – 4:17
 "Cold Rock a Party" (Milk Remix) – 3:19
 "Cold Rock a Party" (Bad Boy Remix—a cappella) – 4:17

Charts

Weekly charts

Year-end charts

Certifications

Release history

References

 

1995 songs
1996 singles
East West Records singles
MC Lyte songs
Missy Elliott songs
Number-one singles in New Zealand
Songs written by Bernard Edwards
Songs written by Missy Elliott
Songs written by Nile Rodgers
Songs written by MC Lyte